The rupee sign "₨" is a currency sign used to represent the monetary unit of account in Pakistan, Sri Lanka, Nepal, Mauritius, Seychelles, and formerly in India. It resembles, and is often written as, the Latin character sequence "Rs", of which (as a single character) it is an orthographic ligature. 

It is common to find a punctuation mark between the rupee symbol and the digits denoting the amount, for example "Re: 1" (for one unit), or "Rs. 140" (for more than one rupee). 

On 15 July 2010, India introduced a new currency symbol, the Indian rupee sign, . This sign is a combination of the Devanagari letter र (ra) and the Latin capital letter R without its vertical bar (similar to the R rotunda).

In Unicode

Rp
Rp is the standard abbreviation for the Indonesian rupiah.

Legacy encoding
This symbol is not present as a separate code point in ISCII or PASCII.

Notes

References

Sign
Currency symbols